Fay Foster (November 8, 1886 – April 17, 1960) was an American composer and teacher.

Biography
Foster was born in Leavenworth, Kansas on November 8, 1886. She studied under the W.H. Sherwood, Gleason, and Mme. Boitte at the Chicago Conservatory, then later under H. Schwartz at the Munich Conservatory, and finally under A. Reisenauer and S. Jadassohn at the Leipzig Conservatory.

Foster taught at the Ogontz School, Rydall, and in New York, San Francisco, and Berlin. She was a member of the Society of American Women Composers.

In 1910, her waltz "Prairie Flowers" won the International Waltz Competition in Berlin. She won first place in the American Composers Competition in 1913. Her song "Are You For Me or Against Me?" won a prize in 1919 from the New York American, a competition with over 10,000 applicants. Foster was the only woman composer to win a prize. Her song "The Americans Come (An Episode in France in the Year 1918)" was named "her greatest contribution" in the 1924 publication Biographical Cyclopedia of American Women. Author Richard Rubin wrote that Foster "was a musician of some repute".

Compositions 
Below is a non-comprehensive list of Foster's compositions.

References

1886 births
1960 deaths
American women educators
American women composers
20th-century American composers
People from Leavenworth, Kansas
Musicians from Kansas
20th-century American women musicians
20th-century women composers